Honeycomb toffee, honeycomb candy, sponge toffee, cinder toffee, seafoam, or hokey pokey is a sugary toffee with a light, rigid, sponge-like texture. Its main ingredients are typically brown sugar (or corn syrup, molasses or golden syrup) and baking soda, sometimes with an acid such as vinegar. The baking soda and acid react to form carbon dioxide which is trapped in the highly viscous mixture. When acid is not used, thermal decomposition of the baking soda releases carbon dioxide. The sponge-like structure is formed while the sugar is liquid, then the toffee sets hard. The candy goes by a variety of names and regional variants.

Owing to its relatively simple recipe and quick preparation time, in some regions it is often made at home, and is a popular recipe for children. It is also made commercially and sold in small blocks, or covered in chocolate, a popular example being the Crunchie bar of Britain or the Violet Crumble of Australia.

Regional names 
Honeycomb toffee is known by a wide variety of names including:
 cinder toffee in Britain
 fairy food candy or angel food candy in Wisconsin
 hokey pokey in New Zealand
 honeycomb in South Africa, Australia, Britain, Ireland, Philippines, and Ohio, United States
 old fashioned puff in Massachusetts
 puff candy in Scotland
 sponge candy in Milwaukee, Wisconsin, St. Paul, Minnesota, Northwest Pennsylvania, and Western New York
 sponge toffee ("tire éponge") in Canada

In various cultures

China 
In China, it is called fēngwōtáng (蜂窩糖; "honeycomb candy"). It is said to be a popular type of confectionery enjoyed during childhood of the post-80s.

Hungary 
In Hungary, it is known as törökméz (Turkish honey) and is commonly sold at town fairs.

Japan 
It is typically hand-made, and often sold by street vendors.

In Japan, raw egg whites are mixed with the baking soda to make the final product have a puffed up, dome shape.

South Korea 

Dalgona is a Korean candy made with melted sugar and baking soda. It was a popular street snack in the 1970s and 1980s, and is still eaten as a retro food.

New Zealand 
Honeycomb toffee is known as hokey pokey (especially in the Kiwi classic Hokey Pokey ice cream) in New Zealand. A very popular ice-cream flavour consisting of plain vanilla ice cream with small, solid lumps of honeycomb toffee is also known as hokey pokey. It is also used to make hokey pokey biscuits.

Taiwan 
In Taiwan, it is called swollen sugar (膨糖, péngtáng or 椪糖, pèngtáng).

Gallery

See also 
 Dalgona
 Hokey pokey
 Yellowman
 Toffee
 List of candies

References 

Toffee
Candy
American confectionery
British confectionery
Canadian confectionery
Hungarian confectionery
Japanese confectionery
Korean confectionery
New Zealand confectionery
Scottish confectionery
South African confectionery